Antonis Siatounis (born 26 August 2002) is a Greek professional footballer who plays as a midfielder or defender for  club Virtus Entella.

Club career

Youth career 
Born in Ilion, a district in west Athens, Greece, Siatounis began his career at Panathinaikos' youth academy in 2011, staying there for eight years. In 2018 he moved to Italy, joining Sampdoria's under-17 team for a fee of €150,000. After playing with the under-18s, in the 2020–21 season Siatounis helped Sampdoria reach the semi-finals with the Primavera (under-19) team, scoring six goals and making seven assists.

Monza 
Following the expiration of his contract with Sampdoria on 30 June 2021, Siatounis joined Serie B side Monza on a three-year contract. He made his unofficial debut on 15 July, as a substitute in a 14–0 friendly win against Real Vicenza. Siatounis scored five days later, in Monza's second pre-season friendly against Anaune Val di Non, which ended in a 5–0 win.

On 1 November, Siatounis made his official debut for Monza, coming on as a substitute against Alessandria in a 1–0 Serie B win.

Virtus Entella 
On 2 January 2023, Siatounis joined Serie C club Virtus Entella, with Monza holding a buy-back clause.

International career 
Siatounis represented Greece at under-17 level between 2018 and 2019, helping his team qualify for the 2019 UEFA European Under-17 Championship, where he played three group-stage games.

Style of play 
A left-footed player, Siatounis transitioned from a winger, to a full-back, to a central midfielder during his youth career at Panathinaikos. While at Sampdoria, he played either as a midfielder (deep-lying playmaker or mezzala) or as a centre-back.

Personal life 
Siatounis is a fan of Greek club Panathinaikos, where his father had played.

Career statistics

Club

References

External links 

 Profile at A.C. Monza

2002 births
Living people
Footballers from Athens
Greek footballers
Association football midfielders
Association football central defenders
Panathinaikos F.C. players
U.C. Sampdoria players
A.C. Monza players
Virtus Entella players
Serie B players
Serie C players
Greece youth international footballers
Greek expatriate footballers
Greek expatriate sportspeople in Italy
Expatriate footballers in Italy